The 1886 Crescent Athletic Club football team was an American football team that represented the Crescent Athletic Club during the 1886 college football season. The team compiled a 4–1 record and played its home games at Crescent Athletic Club grounds at Ninth Avenue and Ninth Street in Brooklyn.

Schedule

References

Crescent Athletic Club
Crescent Athletic Club football seasons
Crescent Athletic Club Football